Agariya may refer to:

Agariya people
Agariya language
Agariya, Bhopal, a village in Madhya Pradesh